Samuel Danford Nicholson (February 22, 1859March 24, 1923) was a United States senator from Colorado.

Born in Springfield, Prince Edward Island, Canada, he attended the public schools there and moved to Michigan and then to Nebraska and later, in 1881, to Leadville, Colorado.

Nicholson became interested in mining, and advanced from miner to foreman, superintendent, manager, and then president of the Western Mining Company. He discovered the zinc ore that bears his name, Nicholsonite.

From 1893 to 1897, Nicholson was the Populist mayor of Leadville; he moved to Denver in 1902. In 1914 and 1916, he was an unsuccessful candidate for governor. During the First World War, he served as State chairman of the Liberty Loan and Victory loan campaigns, and was a member of the United States Fuel Administration. He was elected as a Republican to the United States Senate and served from March 4, 1921, until his death in Denver on March 24, 1923. His interment was in Fairmount Cemetery in Denver.

See also
List of United States senators born outside the United States
List of United States Congress members who died in office (1900–49)

References

External links
 
 

1859 births
1921 deaths
People from Queens County, Prince Edward Island
Mayors of places in Colorado
Republican Party United States senators from Colorado
Canadian emigrants to the United States
Canadian people of Scottish descent
Colorado Republicans
People from Leadville, Colorado